Elise Estrada is the self-titled debut extended play (EP) by Canadian recording artist Elise Estrada. It was released on April 15, 2004.

Track listing

References

Elise Estrada albums
2004 debut EPs